Benjamin Matthew Victor (b. Taft, California, January 16, 1979) is an American sculptor living and working in Boise, Idaho. He is the only living artist to have three works in the National Statuary Hall in the United States Capitol.   He is currently sculpting his fourth statue for the Statuary Hall, of Daisy Bates. He was only 26 years old when his first statue, Sarah Winnemucca, a Paiute activist in Nevada, was dedicated in the Hall in 2005, making him the youngest artist to ever be represented in the Hall. In 2014, his sculpture of Norman Borlaug, "the father of the Green Revolution," was dedicated in the National Statuary Hall and in 2019, his statue of Chief Standing Bear, a Native American rights leader, was dedicated in the National Statuary Hall making him the only living artist to have three sculptures in the Hall.

Early life
Benjamin Matthew Victor was born in 1979 in Taft, California. He grew up in Bakersfield. After completing high school, he lived in for a time in Las Vegas, Nevada. He attended Northern State University in Aberdeen, South Dakota, studying art and sculpture.

Career
Victor’s first work to receive attention was a life-size statue of the biblical character Samson, sculpted when the artist was a sophomore art major at Northern State University. The piece earned Victor a scholarship "in recognition of his aesthetic and conceptual integrity" from the prestigious National Sculpture Society in New York City. At age 23, Victor was commissioned to produce his proposal of a trio of soldiers for the Aberdeen Regional Airport War Memorial in South Dakota.

Victor has completed numerous commissions from city, institutions and non-profits for public art works throughout the West and upper Midwest, often to commemorate individuals or groups. He was commissioned by the state of Nevada to make sculptures of Sarah Winnemucca, a 19th-century Paiute activist, one for installation in 2005 at its capitol and one to be installed as one of Nevada's official works in the United States Statuary Hall in the United States Capitol Building, Washington, D.C. At age 26, Victor was the youngest sculptor to have a work installed at the hall.

Notable works
Aberdeen Monument to Firefighters, Aberdeen Fire Department, Station #1, Aberdeen, South Dakota
Aberdeen War Memorial, Aberdeen Regional Airport, Aberdeen, South Dakota
Answering the Call, Tempe Beach Park, Tempe, Arizona
Belle Babb Mansfield, monument to the First Female Attorney, Iowa Wesleyan College, Iowa
Bob Hoover, Smithsonian Air & Space Museum, Washington, DC
Cecil Harris, Northern State University, Aberdeen, South Dakota
Chief Standing Bear, Centennial Mall, Lincoln, Nebraska
Coach Jim Valvano, North Carolina State Reynolds Coliseum, Raleigh, North Carolina
Coach Everett Case, North Carolina State Reynolds Coliseum, Raleigh, North Carolina 
Community, Wells Avenue, Reno, Nevada
Delilah, Avenue of the Arts, Gillette, Wyoming
 Dr. Norman E Borlaug, National Statuary Hall, Washington, DC
Dr. Susan LaFlesche Picotte, Centennial Mall, Lincoln, Nebraska
Falls Past and Falls Today, Gateway to the Falls, Sioux Falls, South Dakota
Gretchen Fraser, Olympic Women's Monument, Sun Valley, Idaho
Independence, S. Wells Avenue and Roberts Street, Reno, Nevada
Kansas State Monument to Firefighters, Kansas State Capitol Building, Topeka, Kansas
Lyle Smith, Albertsons Stadium, Boise State University, Boise, Idaho
Make a Wish Boy and Girl, Make a Wish Building, Sioux Falls, South Dakota
Monument to 1st Battalion 1st Marines, Castaways Park, Newport Beach, California
Monument to Firefighters, Fire Station #5, Lawrence, Kansas
Monument to WWII Airmen, Boise Airport, Boise, Idaho
Portrait of Terry Redlin, Redlin Art Center, Redlin, South Dakota
ReTrac Corridor Sculpture Project, ReTrac Corridor, Reno, Nevada
Robert the Bruce, Private Collection, Linlithgow, Scotland
Samson, Atlanta, Georgia
Samson the Mighty, Avenue of the Arts, Gillette, Wyoming
Sarah Winnemucca, U.S. National Statuary Hall, Washington, D.C. and Nevada State Capitol Building, Carson City, Nevada
Senator Richard Bryan, University of Nevada, Reno, Nevada
Sequoyah, Private Collection, Oklahoma City, Oklahoma
Taft Oilworker Monument, Taft, CA
The Seasons, United Clinic, Aberdeen, South Dakota
War Memorial Sculpture, Aberdeen Regional Airport, South Dakota
Where Cultures Meet, California State University - Dominguez Hills, Carson, California
Alexander Hamilton, United States Coast Guard Academy, New London, CT (Gift by the Class of '63)

References

External links 
Sarah Winnemucca Statue, U.S. Capitol for Nevada | AOC
https://web.archive.org/web/20110707223651/http://benjaminvictor.com/videos/ksfy_samson_interview.wmv
https://web.archive.org/web/20110707223651/http://www.benjaminvictor.com/articles/scanned/Articles-012.pdf
https://web.archive.org/web/20110707223712/http://www.benjaminvictor.com/articles/scanned/Articles-036.pdf
Ben Victor Studios, Official website
Bakersfield native breaks the mold with third statue at US capitol
http://benjaminvictor.com/wp-content/uploads/2011/10/LifeSizeSamsonTakingShapeatNSU11-26-2002.pdf

1979 births
Living people
People from Bakersfield, California
People from Taft, California
Sculptors from California
21st-century American sculptors
21st-century American male artists
American male sculptors
Northern State University alumni
Boise State University faculty